Vishnampettai is a large village in Budalur block, Thiruvaiyaru taluk of Thanjavur district, Tamil Nadu. This village is located in the banks of Kaveri River, Kollidam River and Kudamurutti River.

Demographics
The total geographical area of Vishnampettai is 607.52hectares. The population of the village is 2655 in which 1314 are male and 1341 are female. The literacy rate of the village is 73.12%.

One of the most notable person is V Ramanathan. He helped develop the archaeological sites and temples in his village. V Ramanathan passed away on July 10th 2007. The temple is now run on his name and yearly festivities are arranged on Vinayaka Chaturthi day.

Transportation and education

Nearest railway stations
 Budalur Railway station-9 km away
 Alakkudi Railway station-14.5 km away
 Lalgudi Railway station-14.8 km away

Nearest airports
 Thanjavur Air force station-22.7 km away
 Tiruchirappalli International Airport-28.1 km away
 Karaikal Airport-97.5 km away

Schools nearby
 Lourdu Xavier Matric Higher Secondary School-0.9 km
 Sacred Heart F.Lawrence Higher Secondary school-2.6 km
 Mettur School-9.2 km

References

Villages in Thanjavur district